Justice Stewart may refer to:

 Potter Stewart (1915–1985), associate justice of the United States Supreme Court
 Andrew Stewart, 1st Lord Avandale (c. 1420–1488), Lord Chancellor of Scotland
 George H. Stewart (1858–1914), associate justice of the Idaho Supreme Court
 I. Daniel Stewart (1933–2005), associate justice of the Utah Supreme Court
 James Augustus Stewart (1808–1879), chief justice of the Court of Appeals of Maryland
 James Garfield Stewart (1880–1959), associate justice of the Ohio Supreme Court
 James Stewart, Duke of Ross (1476–1504), Lord Chancellor of Scotland
 Sam V. Stewart (1872–1939), associate justice of the Montana Supreme Court
 William Stewart, Lord Allanbridge (1925–2012), justice of the Supreme Courts of Scotland

See also
Judge Stewart (disambiguation)
Justice Stuart (disambiguation)